In Eswatini, an inkhundla (plural: tinkhundla) is an administrative subdivision smaller than a district but larger than an umphakatsi (or "chiefdom").  There are 55 tinkhundla in Eswatini: 14 in Hhohho District, 11 in Lubombo District, 16 in Manzini District, and 14 in Shishelweni District. According to the constitution of Eswatini, the government for Eswatini is a democratic, participatory, tinkhundla-based system that emphasizes devolution of state power from central government to tinkhundla areas and individual merit as a basis for election or appointment to public office.  The system is non-partisan since the constitution does not recognize political parties, although section 25 of the constitution allows for open freedom of assembly and association. Each inkhundla elects one representative to the House of Assembly of Eswatini, the lower chamber of the bicameral parliament (Libandla).  The same trend is applied in local government elections. This governing system was designed by King Sobhuza II with the assistance of political scholars and lawyers. It came to effect in 1978 and was adjusted in the early 1990s.

History

The Tinkhundla concept of government has its roots in the Second World War, led by Prince Dabede of Gundvwini Royal Residence and Ndvuna Mfundza John Brightwell Sukati of Zabeni Royal Residence. Veteran Swazi Soldiers, who came back from 1945 to 1946 from the Middle East.  These  soldiers spent sometime with His Majesty King Sobhuza II, relating their experiences gained along the sea shores of the African Continent during the British Military campaign from the Durban Sea Port to Tripoli in North Africa. They recommended that in order for the economy of Swaziland to recover from ravages of the war, community centers (Tinkhundla) should be established and rally support for the King's endeavors to bring about proportional development of the country. Also this would strengthen and enhance national safety and security strategies.

In 1977, King Sobhuza II elected Delimitation Commission came up with a recommendation of twenty two (22) Tinkhundla centres. The first Tinkhundla established were headed by Tindvuna teTinkhundla which were all ex-soldiers (umsizi) appointed by His Majesty King Sobhuza II.

In 1979, Tinkhundla centers were increased from twenty two (22) to forty (40) because it was realized that most people fail to attend and participate Tinkhundla meetings.  In 1993, the Tinkhundla centres were further increased to fifty five (55) following recommendations of the Delimitation Commission that was appointed by His Majesty King Mswati III. This commission was a result of people's views during consultative commissions (Vuselas), which were led by Prince Masitsela, Prince Mahlalengangeni and Prince Guduza.

Governance role

The system emphasizes the devolution of state power from central government to Tinkhundla while individual merit is a basis for election and appointment into public office. In general, Tinkhundla stimulate community development at grassroots level, coordinating and promoting a good relationship between Government and Non-Governmental Organizations (NGOs) working at the Tinkhundla level.  They further provide a link between communities and government as well as other development agents to ensure the responsiveness of all national policies to the needs of the people.  In the process they create harmony among all agents providing services within that Inkhundla.

The Ministry of Tinkhundla Administration and Development  has a mandate to facilitate the management of region development and facilitate promote service delivery at Tinkhundla and Chiefdoms levels.  Tinkhundla are the foundation for the bottom-up development planning process and the delivery of local services in partnership with central government.  A major area of focus in the process is the development; implementation, monitoring and evaluation of evidence based integrated development plans funded by development grants and central government budget where applicable.  The Ministry also has a mandate to bring about improvements in the performance and effectiveness of the administration and management of the Regions, Tinkhundla Committees and chiefdoms.

Economic role

Tinkhundla centres as economic growth point where people meet and communities are mobilized to embark on business projects has been allocated Tinkhundla Empowerment Fund. Initially it was Seventy Thousand Emalangeni (70,000) per Inkhundla, but lately it was upgraded to one hundred and thirty Thousand Emalangeni (E130 000). This caters for the payment of utilities, stationery and minor maintanace of the Tinkhundla offices.

See also
Panchayat (Nepal)

References

External links

Subdivisions of Eswatini